The Tangle Box by Terry Brooks is the fourth novel of the Magic Kingdom of Landover series. This book was first published on April 12, 1994. The plot has an inept old wizard, Horris Kew, accidentally releasing an evil creature called the Gorse. The creature soon imprisons Ben, the dragon Strabo, and the witch Nightshade in a device known as the Tangle Box. They must find a way out while Ben's allies find a way to handle the new threat from the Gorse.

External links
 The Official Terry Brooks Website
 The Tangle Box Page of Terry Brooks' Website

1994 fantasy novels
Magic Kingdom of Landover
Del Rey books